Kelly Richardson (born 1972) is a Canadian artist working with digital technologies to create hyper-real landscapes.

Early life and education
Richardson was born August 2, 1972, in Burlington, Ontario, Canada. From 1994 to 1997, she studied at the Ontario College of Art & Design in Toronto, Ontario. In 2002, she relocated to Halifax, Nova Scotia for her Master of Fine Arts in Media Studies at the Nova Scotia College of Art and Design University. In 2003, she moved to the United Kingdom taking up residence in the northeast where she also completed her master's degree at Newcastle University.

Career
Richardson works with video and digital photography to create hyper-real landscapes. Her work "adopts the use of cinematic language to investigate notions of constructed environments and the blurring of the real versus the unreal. She creates contemplative spaces which offer visual metaphors for the sensations associated with the hugely complicated world we have created for ourselves, magnificent and equally dreadful." As David Jager noted in Canadian Art magazine,
Richardson deploys a formidable range of techniques and a broad palette of approaches in her creation of a new aesthetic, one that elicits a euphoric suspension of disbelief, allowing viewers to delve into the increasingly ambiguous and complex juncture between the real and the represented. She has transformed video, once a self-consciously minimal, anti-cinematic, bare-bones practice, into something much richer, and much stranger.

In 2012, a 15-year retrospective exhibition of her work entitled 'Legion' was organised by and premiered at the Northern Gallery for Contemporary Art in England. The retrospective then toured to the Grundy Art Gallery (UK), Towner (UK) and Albright-Knox Art Gallery (USA).

Biography

Selected exhibitions
 Attenborough Arts Centre, "Mariner 9", Leicester, UK (2020)
SMoCA, "Tales on the Horizon", Scottsdale, Arizona, USA (2015)
 Naturhistorisches Museum Wien, "Mariner 9", Vienna, Austria (2014)
 Albright-Knox Art Gallery, "Kelly Richardson: Legion" (retrospective), Eastbourne, UK (2013)
 Towner, "Legion" (retrospective), Eastbourne, UK (2013)
 Northern Gallery for Contemporary Art, "Legion" (retrospective), Sunderland, UK (2012)
 Le Fresnoy, "Visions Fugitives", Tourcoing, France (2012)
 Albright-Knox, "Videosphere: A New Generation", Buffalo, New York (2011)
 Artpace, "Leviathan", San Antonio, Texas (2011)
 Art Gallery of Ontario, "Sculpture as Time: Major works. New Acquisitions", Toronto, Ontario, Canada (2010)
 Sundance Film Festival, New Frontier on Main, Park City, Utah, USA (2009)
 Beijing 798 Biennale, The Man Who Fell to Earth, Beijing, China (2009)
 Hirshhorn Museum and Sculpture Garden], The Cinema Effect: Illusion, Reality and the Moving Image, Washington, DC, USA (2008)
 Busan Biennale, Expenditure, Busan, South Korea (2008)
 HALLWALLS, The Edge of Everything, Buffalo, New York, USA (2008)
 Le Mois de la Photo à Montréal, Exiles of the Shattered Star, Montreal, Quebec, Canada (2007)
 Gwangju Biennale, A grain of dust, a drop of water, Busan, South Korea (2004)

Public collections
 Albright-Knox Art Gallery, Buffalo, New York, USA
 Art Gallery of Nova Scotia, Halifax, Nova Scotia, Canada
 Art Gallery of Ontario, Toronto, Ontario, Canada
 Arts Council Collection, England
 Hirshhorn Museum and Sculpture Garden, Washington, DC, USA
 Musée d'art contemporain de Montréal, Montréal, Quebec, Canada
 National Gallery of Canada, Ottawa, Ontario, Canada
 SMoCA, USA
 The Collection: NGCA, UK
 Towner, Eastbourne, UK

References

External links
 Official website

1972 births
Living people
Artists from Ontario
Canadian contemporary artists
Canadian video artists
Women video artists
Canadian photographers
NSCAD University alumni
OCAD University alumni
People from Burlington, Ontario